György Baloghy (22 October 1861 – 22 October 1931) was a Hungarian politician and jurist, who served as Minister of Justice in 1919.

References

See also 
 Minister of Justice (Hungary)
 Magyar Életrajzi Lexikon

1861 births
1931 deaths
Justice ministers of Hungary